Oloye
Sir Joseph Odeleye Fadahunsi, KBE (1901 – 12 May 1986) was a Nigerian businessman and politician who was a vice president of the National Council of Nigeria and the Cameroons. He also represented the Ilesha district in the House of Assembly during the nation's first republic. An Oloye of the Yoruba people, he subsequently served as the Governor of the Western Region of Nigeria.

Life 

Fadahunsi was born in Ilesa in 1901. He was educated at Osu Methodist Elementary School and then attended Wesley College, Ibadan. Fadahunsi started work as a teacher at a government assisted school in Ilesha and later taught at schools in Lagos and Ikorodu. Uninterested in teaching, he asked the head of management of the school he was teaching at to assist in a career in commerce. The head subsequently introduced him to United Trading Company (UTC).

Fadahunsi developed a relationship with UTC in 1927 and became a buyer under the United Trading Company, a branch of the Swiss Lutheran Church's missionary association, the Basle Mission. He started his business buying cocoa from farmers and hiring transporters to deliver the produce to the Ibadan office of the United Trading Company. He then earned enough profits to buy his own transport vehicles and his enterprise soon expanded into the transport sector. He founded Ijesa United Trading and Transport Company Ltd to transport produce from his other businesses and also service other commercial firms. His transport business began to earn in some regional recognition. In the late 1940s, he became member of the boards of the Nigerian Cocoa Marketing Board and the Western Region Production Development Board.

In 1951, Fadaunsi joined National Council of Nigeria and the Cameroons, he was elected to the regional House of Assembly as a representative of Ilesa South West. At the assembly, he was deputy leader of the opposition. In 1962, a fracture in the ruling party in the Western region led to the creation of the United People's Party by a splinter group led by the regional premier. The group then went into a coalition with NCNC members. Fadahunsi was appointed as Governor of the region in 1962.

References

National Council of Nigeria and the Cameroons politicians
Members of the House of Representatives (Nigeria)
Governors of Western Nigeria
Knights Commander of the Order of the British Empire
Nigerian recipients of British titles
Nigerian knights
Nigerian royalty
People from Ilesha
1901 births
1986 deaths
Yoruba businesspeople
20th-century Nigerian businesspeople
20th-century Nigerian politicians
Nigerian schoolteachers
Yoruba educators